The Golden Plains Festival is held over three days during the Victorian Labour Day long-weekend on private farmland in Victoria, Australia.  The nearest rural town is Meredith, which is between the regional cities of Geelong and Ballarat. The closest metropolitan city is Melbourne, 90 kilometres away.

About the festival 
Golden Plains is an outdoor camping festival in Australian bushland. The farmland is nicknamed the Meredith Supernatural Amphitheatre for the event; the natural amphitheatre itself is where the bands play.  The surrounding areas – with names such as Spring Valley, North Pines, Mulwaverley, Tasmania, Kevin and West Kevin host bush camping.  Most festival attendees sleep in tents or vans.

The band-viewing area, the amphitheatre, has views over typical Western District farm land which looks quite pretty at Sunset.  There is only one stage at Meredith, which serves to concentrate attention on the music.  Views from around the amphitheatre are unimpeded. The stage is nestled in a grove of native Australian eucalyptus trees.

Golden Plains has a non-commercial ethos, which is a major point of difference between it and other outdoor music festivals. It has no commercial sponsors and there is no commercial signage on the site. Attendees must bring their own alcohol only (in plastic or cans, not glass) – except for the Pink Flamingo Bar, open to those over 18 for cocktails. All fires are prohibited, so attendees usually buy food on-site. There are food and coffee outlets to the left and right of the stage area.

Artists to have played at the festival include Bon Iver, Nile Rodgers, Pavement, Cat Power, Moodymann, Mulatu Astake, Tallest Man On Earth, George Clinton, Yo La Tengo, Comets on Fire, Ween, Sharon Jones & The Dap-Kings, Beirut, The Dirtbombs, The Slits, Fat Freddy's Drop, The Presets, The Drones, The Vines, Iron and Wine, Gotye, Jay Reatard, Mad Professor, Gary Numan, Sebastian & Kavinsky, Quintron And Miss Pussycat, Royal Headache, Muscles and many more.

Golden Plains 2010 featured cult American act Pavement, playing their second show on a worldwide reunion tour of 2010. The event also featured the likes of Calexico, Dinosaur Jr, The Dirty Projectors, The Big Pink, Antibalas Afrobeat Orchestra and Tame Impala. 
 
The land on which the festival takes place is owned by the Nolan family. The first festival was held in 2007, and was sold out and attended by 7,500 people.  The 2009 Golden Plains Festival was held on the second weekend in March.

Golden Plains has twice won 'Australia's Favorite Festival' in Faster Louder's Festival Awards. voted by the festival-going public. The event was named best overall event and Best Management & Facilities in 2008 & 2009.

The 2020 festival missed the national lockdown imposed soon after it ran, but the 2021 festival was cancelled in December 2020.

Awards and nominations

Music Victoria Awards
The Music Victoria Awards, are an annual awards night celebrating Victorian music. They commenced in 2005.

|-
| 2015
| Golden Plains Festival
| Best Festival
| 
|-
| 2017
| Golden Plains Festival
| Best Festival
| 
|-
| 2018
| Golden Plains Festival
| Best Festival
| 
|-
| 2019
| Golden Plains Festival
| Best Festival
| 
|-
| 2020
| Golden Plains Festival
| Best Festival
| 
|-

National Live Music Awards
The National Live Music Awards (NLMAs) are a broad recognition of Australia's diverse live industry, celebrating the success of the Australian live scene. The awards commenced in 2016.

|-
| rowspan="2" |  National Live Music Awards of 2017
| rowspan="2" |  Golden Plains Festival
| Live Event of the Year
| 
|-
|  Victorian Live Event of the Yeart
|

Golden Plains Lineups 
This is a list of Golden Plains lineups by year:

See also
Meredith Music Festival

References

External links
Golden Plains Festival

Festivals in Victoria (Australia)